Potamanaxas latrea, the latrea skipper, is a butterfly in the family Hesperiidae. It is found in Ecuador, Peru, Nicaragua and Costa Rica.

Subspecies
Potamanaxas latrea latrea (Nicaragua)
Potamanaxas latrea caliadne (Godman & Salvin, [1895]) (Costa Rica)
Potamanaxas latrea tusca Evans, 1953 (Ecuador, Peru)
Potamanaxas latrea tyndarus Evans, 1953 (Peru)

References

Butterflies described in 1875
Erynnini
Hesperiidae of South America
Taxa named by William Chapman Hewitson